Lam Eng Rubber Factory (M) Sdn. Bhd. is a Malaysian manufacturer of natural rubber.

The principal activities of the Company consist of processing and manufacturing of rubber and transportation services.

The Company's principal products, natural rubber latex, skim block and Standard Malaysian Rubber are manufactured at their main factory in Sungai Petani, Kedah.

Lam Eng is a member of the Malaysian Rubber Board (Lembaga Getah Malaysia) and the International Rubber Association.

The company supplies natural rubber latex to Coco Industry, Top Glove, Supermax (Malaysia), etc.

References

http://www.ipsofactoj.com/archive/1994/Part5/arc1994(5)-001.htm 
http://www.ipsofactoj.com/appeal/2005/Part4/app2005(4)-004.htm
https://web.archive.org/web/20070927174734/http://www.cljlaw.com/CLJ_Bulletin/Bulletin_15_2005.htm
Ecolex

External links
International Rubber Association listing
Malaysian Rubber Exchange listing

Rubber industry in Malaysia
Manufacturing companies established in 1940
1940 establishments in British Malaya
Privately held companies of Malaysia
Manufacturing companies of Malaysia